Captain Ramón Power y Giralt (October 7, 1775 – June 10, 1813), commonly known as Ramón Power, was, according to Puerto Rican historian Lidio Cruz Monclova, among the first native-born Puerto Ricans to refer to himself as a "Puerto Rican" and to fight for the equal representation of Puerto Rico before the Cortes of Cádiz, the parliamentary government of Spain at the time.

Early years
Power was born in San Juan, Puerto Rico to Joaquín Power y Morgan, a Spaniard from the Basque Country (of Irish and French descent) who came to Puerto Rico in connection with the Compañía de Asiento de Negros, which regulated the slave trade in the island, and  María Josefa Giralt y Santaella a Catalan from Barcelona, Spain.
His great-grandfather Peter Power was Irish from Waterford, he moved to Bordeaux, France and had a son Jean Baptiste Power Dubernet. He settled in Bilbao, where Ramon’s father Joaquín was born.
In San Juan he received his primary education at a private school. In 1788, when he was 13 years old, he was sent to Bilbao, Spain to continue his educational studies.

Spanish Naval service
At the age of 16, Power began his studies of Naval sciences in Spain. Upon graduation he was commissioned a lieutenant in the Spanish Navy and eventually rose to the rank of Captain.

In 1808, following Napoleon's invasion of Spain, the criollos of Santo Domingo revolted against French rule. Colonel Rafael Conti,  a fellow Puerto Rican, organized an expedition to return Hispaniola back to Spain. Col Conti together with naval Captain Power y Giralt distinguished themselves with the defense of the Spanish colony of Santo Domingo against an invasion from the French forces by enforcing a blockade with the aid of Great Britain (Spain's ally at the time) and Haiti, returning Santo Domingo back to Spanish control.

Political career

On May 4, 1809, in the midst of Peninsular War and Napoleon Bonaparte's occupation of Spain, Power was elected by the five, local cabildos (town councils) to represent Puerto Rico in the Junta Suprema Central y Gubernativa del Reino (Supreme Central and Governing Board of the Kingdom). (In 1808 Napoleon had deposed Ferdinand VII and named his eldest brother, Joseph I, King of Spain. The Junta Suprema was leading the resistance against the Bonapartes.) The Junta Suprema dissolved itself before Power could arrive, nevertheless, the following year on April 16, he was again elected to represent Puerto Rico, this time in the Cortes of Cádiz, the parliamentary assembly serving as a Regency while awaiting Ferdinand VII's return, that had been convened by the Junta and was gathering in the Southern Spanish port of Cádiz. One of his greatest supporters was Bishop Juan Alejo de Arizmendi, who during the official farewell Mass, gave Power his episcopal ring as a reminder that he should never forget his countrymen. After arriving in Cádiz on June 8, 1810 he joined the growing number of delegates, which finally reached a quorum in September. 

Power was an avid advocate for Puerto Rico during his tenure (September 24, 1810 — June 10, 1813) as a delegate in the Cortes. On September 25, 1810, the second day of regular meetings, he was elected as vice-president of the Cortes and succeeded in obtaining powers which would benefit the economy of the Puerto Rico. The most well-known product of the assembly was the Constitution of 1812.

Before the Constitution was written, Power convinced the Cortes to reverse a decree of the Council of Regency which had given the governor of Puerto Rico extraordinary powers in reaction to the establishment of juntas in South America. The highlight of his legislative career was the Ley Power ("the Power Act"), which designated five ports for free commerce. Thus, the ports of Fajardo, Mayagüez, Aguadilla, Cabo Rojo and Ponce established the reduction of most tariffs and eliminated the flour monopoly, in addition to establishing other economic reforms with the goal of developing a more efficient economy. It also called for the establishment of a Sociedad Económica de Amigos del País en Puerto Rico on the island, which was approved in 1814. Many of these reforms remained in effect even after Ferdinand VII revoked the Spanish Constitution.

Death
Power died while still in Cádiz on June 10, 1813, from the yellow fever epidemic which had spread throughout Europe. He was succeeded in the Cortes by José María Quiñones who served from November 25, 1813 to May 10, 1814. He was buried at the Oratorio de San Felipe Neri church in Cádiz.

Return of his remains to Puerto Rico

According to The San Juan Star (Puerto Rico's English language newspaper), a movement led by the Archbishop of San Juan, Roberto González Nieves, was successful in its attempt to bring Power's remains back to Puerto Rico. Power's remains were exhumed where he was interred along with other delegates' to the Cortes, at the church in Cadiz. 

After DNA testing, the remains were brought by the Spanish tall ship Juan Sebastián Elcano. On March 2, 2013, it left the port of Cádiz, stopping at Las Palmas de Gran Canaria, Canary Islands before leaving on March 10 across the Atlantic Ocean taking 28 days to return Power y Giralt's body to San Juan, Puerto Rico on April 6, 2013. It was escorted by the United States Coast Guard into the port and received with a 21 gun salute. Present to receive the remains were the Governor of Puerto Rico, and presidents of all branches of government.
His resting place now is at the Cathedral of San Juan Bautista next to Bishop Juan Alejo de Arizmendi.

Honors and tributes

Both Puerto Rico and Spain have honored Power's memory, by naming several avenues after him. San Juan also has a school named after Power the "Ramon Power y Giralt School" located in Calle Loiza Final. The city of Ponce has a street named after him; it runs west to east and is located between (i.e., parallel to) Calle Ferrocarril and Avenida Las Américas, and has its western terminus at Calle Concordia and its eastern terminus at Avenida Hostos. 

His former residence was restored and currently houses the Puerto Rico Conservation Trust in Old San Juan. Power's contemporary, José Campeche, honored him in a painting entitled The Shipwreck of Power. Graphic artist Lorenzo Homar has also dedicated one of his artistic works to Ramón Power.

Ancestry

See also

 List of Puerto Ricans
 Irish immigration to Puerto Rico
 List of Puerto Rican military personnel

References

External links
 El Nuevo Dia

1775 births
1813 deaths
Burials at the Cathedral of San Juan Bautista, Puerto Rico
People from San Juan, Puerto Rico
Puerto Rican people of Irish descent
Deaths from yellow fever
Puerto Rican Spanish Navy personnel
Spanish admirals
18th-century Puerto Rican people
19th-century Puerto Rican people
Puerto Rican military officers
Puerto Rican politicians
Infectious disease deaths in Spain